The Crimean Tatar cuisine is primarily the cuisine of the Crimean Tatars, who live on the Crimean Peninsula. The traditional cuisine of the Crimean Tatars has similarities with that of Greeks, Italians, Balkan peoples, Nogays, North Caucasians, and Volga Tatars, although some national dishes and dietary habits vary between different Crimean Tatar regional subgroups; for example, fish and produce are more popular among Yaliboylu and Tat dishes while meat and dairy is more prevalent in Steppe Tatar cuisine. Many Uzbek dishes were incorporated into Crimean Tatar national cuisine during exile in Central Asia since 1944, and these dishes have become prevalent in Crimea since the return. In turn, some Crimean Tatar dishes, including Chiburekki, have been adopted by peoples outside Crimea, such as in Turkey and the North Caucasus.

Traditional dishes 
  (or ) is a fried turnover with a filling of ground or minced meat and onions. Made with one round piece of dough folded over the filling in a half-moon shape. A national dish of Crimean Tatars, it is also popular in Crimean Tatar diasporas in Turkey, Romania, Russia, and Uzbekistan.
 , a traditional Crimean meat pie dish
 , a  that is grilled, not fried.
 , a traditional pie with a rice-and-chicken filling baked between two layers of dough. Served as a main course,  can be made with alternative fillings, such as rice and meat, meat with potatoes and onions, or even potatoes and cheese.
 , small dumplings with a meat filling cooked in a broth and served as a main dish or in a soup. 
 , a meat soup with large pieces of beef and mutton, onion, carrots, and other vegetables.
 , a soup made from green peas or beans, a vegetarian dish.
 , a traditional dessert.
 Dolma, bell pepper with meat
 Sarma, meat wrapped in grape leaves
 Beshbarmaq, a dish which is especially popular among a steppe sub-ethnic group
 Ayran, a national drink
 Pite, a traditional bread
 Tatar (qashiq) ash

See also
Tatar cuisine
Russian cuisine
Ukrainian cuisine

References

Bibliography 
 Crimean diet a century ago, including recipes of traditional Crimean Tatar dishes. Retrieved on 16 May 2009
 G. R. Mack and A. Surina, Food culture in Russia and Central Asia, Greenwood Publishing Group, 2005, . Retrieved on 16 May 2009
 S. Johnstone and G. Bloom, Ukraine, Lonely Planet, 2008, p. 197, . Retrieved on 16 May 2009
 A gallery of Crimean Tatar food, International Committee for Crimea, Washington, DC. Retrieved on 16 May 2009

Crimean Tatar culture
Ukrainian cuisine
Russian cuisine